Lieutenant-Colonel Alfred Thomas Goldie Gardner  (31 May 1890 – 25 August 1958) was an English racing car driver who was awarded the BRDC Gold Star three times. In 1939 he was the first to exceed 200 mph in a light car.

Early life
Gardner who was known as Goldie Gardner (Goldie was his mother's maiden name) was born in Woodford Green, Essex, and was educated at Pelham House, School, Sandgate, Kent. and Uppingham School. In 1910 he embarked from England to Colombo, Ceylon, to take up a 3-year business appointment. Upon completion of his Ceylon contract he gained a new appointment in Katha, Burma, but it was cut short by a bad attack of typhoid fever with malaria and he was sent back to England on six months' sick leave.

First world war
During his convalescence in 1914, the First World War started. He enlisted in September of that year and was granted a commission in the Royal Artillery as a second lieutenant. Gardner had a distinguished military career and was the youngest officer in the British Army to become a Major. He suffered severe injuries to his right hip and leg when his reconnaissance plane was shot down in August 1917. Despite receiving some twenty operations over a period of two years spent in hospital the leg did not return to full function. He was discharged from the army in 1921 as medically unfit for further service.

Motorsport
In 1924 he purchased a Gordon England special Austin Seven and despite his disability began racing on the British circuits. 1930 saw him team up with MG Cars and he raced various of these marks with considerable success. He suffered a crash during the 1932 RAC Tourist Trophy race at Ards in Northern Ireland that further worsened the disability to his already damaged leg. By 1934 he was fit enough to continue track racing and in the 500 mile race at Brooklands with co-driver Dr.J.D.Benjafield he achieved third place as well as winning the 1,100cc class.

After accompanying Sir Malcolm Campbell's expedition to Daytona Beach, Florida, in 1935 to witness the World Land speed record attempt, he returned to England and concentrated on speed racing records. On 31 May 1939 just before the outbreak of World War II driving his special engineered MG, in Dessau, Germany, on the Dessauer Rennstrecke, now Bundesautobahn 9, Goldie Gardner took the 750cc up to 1,100cc class records over 2 kilometres, 1 mile, and 5 kilometres distances, at average speeds of 203.5 mph, 203.3 mph and 197.5 mph respectively. After an overnight engine rebore, on 2 June 1939 at the same venue he gained the 1,100cc to 1,500cc class records over the same distances at average speeds of 204.3 mph, 203.9 mph and 200.6 mph.

Second World War
During World War II 1939-1945 Gardner offered his service and was accepted as a second lieutenant in Mechanical Transport Training. He rapidly regained his old rank as major and eventually in 1942 he was promoted to lieutenant colonel.

Postwar record breaking
In the 11 peacetime years between 1936 and 1950 he set over 100 international and local speed records throughout England, Europe and the USA.

Experimental Jaguar XK100
In September 1948 immediately before the announcement of Jaguar's new engine since named XK he broke the flying mile, kilometre and five-kilometre Class E records on the new motor road near Ostend. At the time it was considered remarkable that his engine was unsupercharged. This engine, commonly known as X100, was one of a series of development engines which started with XF and then XG. These were under 1,800cc and push rod operated, Then came th XJ engine, which is the engine here, sporting double overhead camshafts and a capacity of 2 litres. Four are known to exist. It was intended to be a cheaper option for the XK120 but was dropped in favour of the 3442cc Jaguar six cylinder XK engine.  The new records were: mile 173.678 mph, kilometre 177.112 mph and five kilometres 170.523 mph.

MG EX-135

In 1951 at Bonneville Salt Flats, Utah, with his supercharged MG streamliner EX-135 car he obtained 6 international and 10 American records in the 1,100cc to 1,500cc engine class. In 1952 he returned to Bonneville with the MG EX-135 car and set 21 speed records in the same engine class as the previous year.

Retirement

In 1952 he suffered a cerebral hemorrhage and was forced to retire from motor sport.

Family life
On 10 March 1936 he married Mary Eleanor King Boalt in Daytona Beach, Florida, United States.  She was an heir to the J.R. Watkins company in Winona, MN.  They had divorced by 1940.

In 1940 he married Una Eagle-Clarke (1914–2008). They had one daughter Rosalind, Gardner died in 1958 age 68 and was buried at Ocklynge Cemetery in Eastbourne.

Awards and honours
British Racing Drivers' Club gold star winner three times in 1938, 1947 and 1949. Awarded the Segrave Trophy in 1938.

References

Further reading
 MAGIC M.P.H. 1951 Publication by Lt.-Col. A.T. Goldie Gardner, O.B.E., M.C.

1890 births
1958 deaths
Segrave Trophy recipients
BRDC Gold Star winners
English racing drivers
Brighton Speed Trials people
Bonneville 200 MPH Club members
People from Woodford, London
Royal Artillery officers
British Army personnel of World War I
Recipients of the Military Cross
British Army personnel of World War II
People educated at Uppingham School